TechShop was a chain of membership-based, open-access, do-it-yourself (DIY) workshops and fabrication studios.  they had ten locations in the United States: three in California, one in Arizona, one in Arlington, Virginia (near DC), one in Michigan, one in Texas, one in Pittsburgh, Pennsylvania, 
one in St. Louis, Missouri, and one in Brooklyn, New York, as well as four international locations.

TechShop offered safety and basic use training on all of its tools and equipment in addition to advanced and special interest classes and workshops. For most equipment, a safety and use class had to be completed before it could be used. It was affiliated with the maker culture and participated in annual Maker Faire events.

On November 15, 2017, with no warning, the company closed all domestic locations and announced it would declare bankruptcy under Chapter 7 of the U.S. bankruptcy code (immediate liquidation).  An effort to purchase the company's assets and reopen the workshops fell through; however, the San Francisco location was reopened by a new owner on February 19, 2018.  The original TechShop filed for bankruptcy a few days later, on February 26, 2018.

History
TechShop was founded by Jim Newton and Ridge McGhee. Jim Newton originally wanted to establish a place with tools to work on pet projects. Newton, who had been a science adviser to the TV show MythBusters and a College of San Mateo robotics teacher, was also motivated by his students' frustration with lack of access to equipment.

Ridge McGhee, a resident of Atherton, California, was upset by the loss of American manufacturing capability to other countries. After a highly successful donation drive, the first TechShop officially opened to the public on October 1, 2006 in Menlo Park, California. TechShop had over 9,000 active members and trained over 100,000 people through their skill building classes and STEAM youth programs.

Sudden closure
On November 15, 2017, with no formal warning, TechShop announced its immediate closure  and planned Chapter 7 bankruptcy.  TechShop's locations outside of the United States are not affected and will remain open. TechShop filed bankruptcy on February 26, 2018.

Attempted acquisition
A group headed by Dan Rasure of Kansas announced in December 2017 that it was attempting to acquire the company's assets including secured debt and planned to reopen some of the TechShop locations under the name TechShop 2.0. That effort fell through; Rasure announced in February 2018 that he would reopen the downtown San Francisco location later that month and possibly also open a new San Jose location. His company, TechShop 2.0, is independent of the original TechShop.

Trademark dispute
On February 16, 2018, the original TechShop filed a lawsuit alleging  tradename and trademark violations by the new company. The new company immediately changed its name to "TheShop.Build."  A trial began on June 4, 2019 in Oakland, California.  On June 12, 2019, the trial jury returned a verdict, finding that "TheShop" willfully infringed on Techshop's service mark, but also finding zero profit from the use, and no actual damages.  Attorneys for the bankrupt Techshop indicated they will appeal the zero jury verdict.  On March 9, 2020, Federal Judge Haywood S. Gilliam, Jr. denied several plaintiff motions, including a request for a new trial.  No more court filings occurred since March 17, 2020.

Locations
US (closed) - Allen Park, MI; Arlington, VA; Beaverton, OR; Chandler, AZ; Pittsburgh, PA; Redwood City, CA; Round Rock, TX; San Jose, CA; San Francisco, CA; St Louis, MO, and Brooklyn, NYC.

International - Tokyo, Japan; Abu Dhabi, UAE; Paris & Lille, France

Partnerships
A location in Metro Detroit opened on May 4, 2012 in a 38,000-square-foot facility in the suburb of Allen Park. This facility was launched in a partnership between Ford and software company Autodesk, and was the largest TechShop facility.

TechShop Austin-Round Rock, serving the metro Austin (Texas) area, opened on October 13, 2012. It was located adjacent to a Lowe's home improvement store and partnered with the chain to host workshops, supply tools, and provide materials.

TechShop opened a location in Chandler, Arizona, in partnership with Arizona State University on January 17, 2014. The first university-TechShop partnering was located at the ASU Chandler Innovation Center, an engineering and technology-based education and research hub located in downtown Chandler at the city's former public works yard at 249 E. Chicago Street.

Internationally, TechShop had partnership locations in Tokyo (with Fujitsu), the United Arab Emirates (with the Department of Education And Knowledge - ADEK ), and Ivry (next to Paris), France (with ADEO Leroy Merlin).

Additional partnerships included Samsung, Instructables, Cortex, FutureWorks NYC, the U.S. Department of Veterans Affairs, National Instruments, and DARPA.

Typical tools and equipment offered

Table saw
Power miter saw
Abrasive saw
Manual mills, Tormach 3 + 1 axis CNC mill, and metal lathes
ShopBot 3 axis CNC router
Welding equipment including MIG, TIG, gas, and arc welders
Sheet metal fabrication equipment
Oscilloscopes and other electronics equipment
Equipment for working with plastics
Laser cutter and engraver
Entry-level 3D printers.
Textiles area with home and industrial sewing machines
STEAM lab for youth

Alternatives
The sudden and unexpected closure of TechShop created a crisis for many small businesses and hobbyists who depended upon TechShop for the unique services it offered. In the scramble that followed, several alternatives were sought out or founded.

One of them was the reopening of the San Francisco location under the name "TheShop.build" by a new owner, Dan Rasure.  A second location was opened in San Jose. However, both locations closed in less than one year and the organization's web site was taken down. An email from Dan Rasure stated that over $2 million was spent on legal fees fighting TechShop stakeholders.
                                    
Noisebridge, a nonprofit hackerspace in San Francisco, held a Life After Techshop meetup to welcome former TechShop members.

In Chandler, users created their own space, with the help of the city.

In response to the closing, a group of makers in the San Francisco Bay Area created a new nonprofit called "Maker Nexus" in Sunnyvale.

In 2018, former members and staff of the Pittsburgh TechShop founded Protohaven - a non-profit design school and makerspace focused on making for the public good.

References

External links

TechShop now defunct web site
TheShop official website 
Five ways the Maker Movement can help catalyze a manufacturing renaissance
This 22,000-Square-Foot Makerspace Is An Inventor's Paradise
TechShop: Paradise for Tinkerers
Step inside an inventor's playground
TechShop gives the Maker Movement a big boost
Photos: Hobbyists heed TechShop's siren song
TechShop - A place for Makers to work on their projects
TechShop Discussion Forum on Reddit
Maker Nexus

DIY culture
Retail companies established in 2006
Hackerspaces
2006 establishments in California
Retail companies disestablished in 2017
2017 disestablishments in California
Insolvent companies